Under Dutch law, moord (murder) is the intentional and premeditated killing of another person. Murder is punishable by a maximum sentence of life imprisonment, which is the longest prison sentence the law will allow for. Unlike in most other European countries, there is no possibility for parole for those sentenced to life in the Netherlands. It is one of the few countries in Europe where life imprisonment actually lasts for the remainder of the life of the convicted person, unless the sentence is commuted or pardoned by the Sovereign of the Netherlands. However, this rarely (if ever) happens and few appeals to the King for clemency have ever been successful.

A common misconception is that the maximum sentence is 30 years (or 20 until 2006): this is actually  the longest determinate sentence that can be imposed other than life imprisonment.

Intentionally killing another person without premeditation is called doodslag ("deathslaughter", i.e. manslaughter) and carries a maximum sentence of fifteen years' imprisonment or life if committed under aggravating circumstances ("qualified manslaughter") or as an act of terrorism.

In the first decade of the 21st century a life sentence was handed out 26 times by Dutch judges. All convicts will die in prison unless pardoned by Royal decree. In addition to a prison sentence, the judge may also sentence the suspect to terbeschikkingstelling (literally: entrustment, i.e. to the State), or TBS in short, meaning detention in a psychiatric institution for treatment, sometimes compulsory. TBS is imposed for a two-year term but can subsequently be prolonged for one or two years if deemed necessary by a committee of psychiatrists. Normal TBS can only be prolonged up to a term of four to nine years, whereas compulsory TBS can be prolonged indefinitely.

Dutch homicide laws  

The Dutch penal code, Wetboek van Strafrecht ("Lawbook of Penal justice"), specifies the following kinds of homicide:

 Article 97 – "An attack carried out with the intention of taking the life or liberty of the King, the reigning Queen or the Regent"
 Article 108 – "An attack on the life or liberty of the King's consort, of the King's heir apparent or his spouse"
 Article 115 – "An attack on the life or liberty of a head of a friendly nation"
 Article 117 – "An attack on the life or liberty of an internationally protected person"
 Article 287 – Manslaughter
 Article 288 – Aggravated manslaughter
 Article 288a – Manslaughter committed with terrorist intent
 Article 289 – Murder
 Article 289a – Conspiracy to commit murder or manslaughter with terrorist intent
 Article 290 – Child manslaughter
 Article 291 – Child murder
 Article 293 – Euthanasia
 Article 307 – Involuntary manslaughter

See also 
 Deventer murder case
 Assassination of Pim Fortuyn
List of murder laws by country

References

External links
 Dutch Penal Code
 Dutch Penal Code (English translation)

Netherlands, the
Law of the Netherlands
Murder in the Netherlands

nl:Moord